Üçüncü Ağalı is a village in the Zangilan District of Azerbaijan.

History 
The village was located in the Armenian-occupied territories surrounding Nagorno-Karabakh, coming under the control of ethnic Armenian forces during the First Nagorno-Karabakh War in the early 1990s, subsequently becoming part of the breakaway Republic of Artsakh as part of its Kashatagh Province, being referred to as Aghadzor. It was recaptured by Azerbaijan on 21 October 2020 during the 2020 Nagorno-Karabakh conflict.

References

External links 

Populated places in Zangilan District